The 2006 Country Music Association Award, 40th Annual Ceremony, took place on November 6, 2006, and was the first ceremony to be held at the Gaylord Entertainment Center (later known as Bridgestone Arena) in Nashville, Tennessee. This was also the first ceremony to be broadcast live from ABC. Brooks & Dunn, and Brad Paisley led with 6 nominations each including Album of the Year, and Entertainer of the Year.

Winners and Nominees

Hall of Fame

Performers and presenters 
Performers

Presenters

References 

Country Music Association
CMA
Country Music Association Awards
Country Music Association Awards
November 2006 events in the United States
2006 awards in the United States
21st century in Nashville, Tennessee
Events in Nashville, Tennessee